Channel 35 refers to several television stations:

Canada
The following television stations operate on virtual channel 35 in Canada:
 CFJP-DT in Montreal, Quebec
 CHCJ-DT in Hamilton, Ontario
 CIIT-DT in Winnipeg, Manitoba
 CIVK-DT-3 in Gaspé, Quebec

Mexico
One television station operates on virtual channel 35 in Mexico:
 XHUJAT-TDT in Villahermosa, Tabasco

See also
 Channel 35 virtual TV stations in the United States
For UHF frequencies covering 596-602 MHz:
 Channel 35 TV stations in Canada
 Channel 35 TV stations in Mexico
 Channel 35 digital TV stations in the United States
 Channel 35 low-power TV stations in the United States

35